Cheepurapalli Veeraghavulu Stephen (born 3 December 1993) is an Indian cricketer who plays for Andhra cricket team. He is a left-arm medium-fast bowler, who played for Andhra Under-16s and Andhra Under-19s before making his debut for Andhra. He was selected in the South Zone squad for the 2014–15 Deodhar Trophy.

References

External links

Living people
1993 births
Indian cricketers
Andhra cricketers
South Zone cricketers
Cricketers from Andhra Pradesh
People from East Godavari district